The Then language (also known as Yánghuáng 佯僙语 in Chinese; alternate spellings: Tʻen and Ten) is a Kam–Sui language spoken in Pingtang County, southern Guizhou. It is spoken by the Yanghuang 佯僙 people, many of whom are officially classified as Maonan by the Chinese government.

Names
The Yanghuang people called themselves , except for the Yanghuang of Huishui County, Xiayou District , and Xiguan Shangmo , who called themselves  (Bo 1997).

"Yanghuang" was mentioned in a Ming Dynasty record, the Dushi Fangyu Jiyao. According to it, "the Man people of Sizhou are Yanghuang, Gelao, Muyao (Mulao), and Miaozhi (Miaozi).

Dialects
Bo (1997:138-139) lists three main dialects of Yanghuang.

Hedong 河东: spoken by more than 15,000 people, 10,000 of whom are daily users of the language. It is spoken east of the Pingtang River 平塘河 in the townships of Kapu 卡蒲乡 and Zhemi 者密镇, in Pingtang County, as well as in parts of western Dushan County, including Balang village 坝浪寨. Their autonym is ai1 raːu1. This is the representative dialect studied most by Bo (1997). 
Hexi 河西: active speaker population of about 2,000 out of a population of about 10,000 people. It is spoken west of the Pingtang River 平塘河 in the western part of Zhemi Township 者密镇, Pingtang County (in the villages of Liudongba 六硐坝 and Jiaqing 甲青), and neighboring areas.
Huishui 惠水: spoken only by elderly people out of a population of about 2,000-3,000 people. Middle-aged and younger people do not speak the Huishui variety of Then anymore. It is spoken in Huishui County. It is spoken around the village of Yaoshao 姚哨, but not in Yaoshao 姚哨 itself. This is the most divergent dialect, and is most heavily influenced by Chinese. Their autonym ai1 thən2. Their ancestors had reportedly migrated from Liudongba 六硐坝 during the 1800s.

Phonology
Yanghuang of Kapu Township (卡蒲乡) has 71 consonants total, including those with secondary articulations. There are a total of 71 rhymes, 9 vowels, and 8 codas (Bo 1997).

References

 Bo, Wenze [薄文泽]. 1997. Yanghuang yu yan jiu (A Study of Yanghuang [Then]) [佯僙语研究]. Beijing: Minzu University Press [中央民族大学出版社].

External links
Then word list from the Austronesian Basic Vocabulary Database

Languages of China
Kam–Sui languages